João Pina (born 13 July 1981) is a Portuguese judoka. He won consecutive European titles in the under-73 kg category at the 2010 and 2011 European Judo Championships.

He has competed three times at the Olympics.  He finished in 7th in 2004 in the -66 kg category, losing to eventual bronze medalist Yordanis Arencibia.  Moving up to the -73 kg category, he finished 13th at the 2008 Summer Olympics, and 16th at the 2012 Summer Olympics.

Achievements

References

External links

 
 

 João Pina joins Sporting Clube de Portugal

1981 births
Living people
Portuguese male judoka
Olympic judoka of Portugal
Judoka at the 2004 Summer Olympics
Judoka at the 2008 Summer Olympics
Judoka at the 2012 Summer Olympics
20th-century Portuguese people
21st-century Portuguese people